Alison Wágner Lira Ferreira (born 21 October 1983), simply known as Alison, is a retired Brazilian footballer who played as a defender.

On 10 October 2019, 35-year old Alison announced his retirement.

Career statistics

References

External links

1983 births
Living people
Brazilian footballers
Association football defenders
Campeonato Brasileiro Série A players
Campeonato Brasileiro Série B players
Campeonato Brasileiro Série C players
Campeonato Brasileiro Série D players
Treze Futebol Clube players
Criciúma Esporte Clube players
Esporte Clube Bahia players
Esporte Clube Vitória players
ABC Futebol Clube players
Clube Náutico Capibaribe players
América Futebol Clube (MG) players
Ituano FC players
Santa Cruz Futebol Clube players
América Futebol Clube (RN) players